Jerdon's leafbird (Chloropsis jerdoni) is a species of leafbird found in forest and woodland in India and Sri Lanka. Its name honours Thomas C. Jerdon. It has traditionally been considered a subspecies of the blue-winged leafbird (C. cochinchinensis), but differ in measurements and morphology, it lacking the blue flight feathers for which the blue-winged leafbird was named.

It builds its nest in a tree, and lays 2–3 eggs. This species eats insects, fruit and nectar.

The male is green-bodied with a yellow-tinged head, black face and throat. It has a blue moustachial line. The female differs in that it has a greener head and blue throat, and young birds are like the female but without the blue throat patch.

Like other leafbirds, the call of Jerdon's leafbird consists of a rich mixture of imitations of the calls of various other species of birds. They are very shy of water, will only come down to drink for very short periods and are quick to flee.

Gallery

References

 BirdLife Species Factsheet. BirdLife International. Accessed 2008-06-25.
 Wells, D. R. (2005). Chloropsis jerdoni (Jerdon's Leafbird). P. 264 in: del Hoyo, J., A. Elliott, & D. A. Christie. eds. (2005). Handbook of the Birds of the World. Vol. 10. Cuckoo-shrikes to Thrushes. Lynx Edicions, Barcelona.

Jerdon's leafbird
Birds of India
Birds of Sri Lanka
Jerdon's leafbird
Jerdon's leafbird

id:Cica-daun sayap-biru
ms:Burung Daun Sayap Biru
th:นกเขียวก้านตองปีกสีฟ้า